In the mathematical field of numerical analysis, De Casteljau's algorithm is a recursive method to evaluate polynomials in Bernstein form or Bézier curves, named after its inventor Paul de Casteljau. De Casteljau's algorithm can also be used to split a single Bézier curve into two Bézier curves at an arbitrary parameter value.

Although the algorithm is slower for most architectures when compared with the direct approach, it is more numerically stable.

Definition
A Bézier curve  (of degree , with control points ) can be written in Bernstein form as follows

where  is a Bernstein basis polynomial

The curve at point  can be evaluated with the recurrence relation

The result  is given by

Moreover, the Bézier curve  can be split at point  into two curves with respective control points:

Example implementation 
Here is an example implementation of De Casteljau's algorithm in Haskell:
deCasteljau :: Double -> [(Double, Double)] -> (Double, Double)
deCasteljau t [b] = b
deCasteljau t coefs = deCasteljau t reduced
  where
    reduced = zipWith (lerpP t) coefs (tail coefs)
    lerpP t (x0, y0) (x1, y1) = (lerp t x0 x1, lerp t y0 y1)
    lerp t a b = t * b + (1 - t) * a

An example implementation of De Casteljau's algorithm in Python:
def de_casteljau(t, coefs):
    beta = [c for c in coefs] # values in this list are overridden
    n = len(beta)
    for j in range(1, n):
        for k in range(n - j):
            beta[k] = beta[k] * (1 - t) + beta[k + 1] * t
    return beta[0]

An example implementation of De Casteljau's algorithm in JavaScript:

// Example: lerp(0.5, 0.0, 1.0) == 0.5
let lerp = (t, p1, p2) => (1 - t) * p1 + t * p2;

// Example: reduce(0.5, ...[0.0, 1.0, 2.0, 3.0]) == [0.5, 1.5, 2.5]
let reduce = (t, p1, p2, ...ps) => ps.length > 0
    ? [lerp(t, p1, p2), ...reduce(t, p2, ...ps)]
    : [lerp(t, p1, p2)];

// Example: deCasteljau(0.5, [0.0, 1.0, 2.0, 3.0]) == 1.5
let deCasteljau = (t, ps) => ps.length > 1
    ? deCasteljau(t, reduce(t, ...ps))
    : ps[0];

Notes
When doing the calculation by hand it is useful to write down the coefficients in a triangle scheme as

When choosing a point t0 to evaluate a Bernstein polynomial we can use the two diagonals of the triangle scheme to construct a division of the polynomial

into

and

Example
We want to evaluate the Bernstein polynomial of degree 2 with the Bernstein coefficients

at the point t0.

We start the recursion with

and with the second iteration the recursion stops with

which is the expected Bernstein polynomial of degree 2.

Bézier curve

When evaluating a Bézier curve of degree n in 3-dimensional space with n + 1 control points Pi

with

we split the Bézier curve into three separate equations

which we evaluate individually using De Casteljau's algorithm.

Geometric interpretation
The geometric interpretation of De Casteljau's algorithm is straightforward. 
Consider a Bézier curve with control points . Connecting the consecutive points we create the control polygon of the curve.
Subdivide now each line segment of this polygon with the ratio  and connect the points you get. This way you arrive at the new polygon having one fewer segment.
Repeat the process until you arrive at the single point – this is the point of the curve corresponding to the parameter .
The following picture shows this process for a cubic Bézier curve:

Note that the intermediate points that were constructed are in fact the control points for two new Bézier curves, both exactly coincident with the old one.

The interpretation given above is valid for a nonrational Bézier curve. The resulting four-dimensional points may be projected back into three-space with a perspective divide.

In general, operations on a rational curve (or surface) are equivalent to operations on a nonrational curve in a projective space. This representation as the "weighted control points" and weights is often convenient when evaluating rational curves.

See also
Bézier curves
De Boor's algorithm
Horner scheme to evaluate polynomials in monomial form
Clenshaw algorithm to evaluate polynomials in Chebyshev form

References
Farin, Gerald & Hansford, Dianne (2000). The Essentials of CAGD.  Natic, MA: A K Peters, Ltd.

External links
 Piecewise linear approximation of Bézier curves – description of De Casteljau's algorithm, including a criterion to determine when to stop the recursion
 Bezier Curves and Picasso  — Description and illustration of De Casteljau's algorithm applied to cubic Bézier curves.
 de Casteljau's algorithm - Implementation help and interactive demonstration of the algorithm.

Splines (mathematics)
Numerical analysis
Articles with example Haskell code